The Chevrolet Corvette C6.R is a grand tourer racing car built by Pratt & Miller and Chevrolet for competition in endurance racing.  It is a replacement for the Corvette C5-R racing car, applying the body style of the new C6 generation Chevrolet Corvette as well as improvements to increase the speed and reliability on the track.  Since its debut in 2005, it has continued on from the previous dominance of the C5-R in its racing class with multiple American Le Mans Series championships and race wins in the Le Mans Series, FIA GT Championship, and 24 Hours of Le Mans. There are two main versions of the Corvette C6.R: the GT1 version which has 590 HP, carbon-ceramic brakes, and aggressive aerodynamics, and the GT2 version which has 470 HP, iron brakes, and relatively stock aerodynamics with respect to the road car. Unrestricted though, the LS7.R engine will produce around 800 hp. By 2012 the C6.R GT1 was retired from the competition while the GT2 version continues to race around the world.

Development
Having already established the C5-R as a winning car, the development of the C6.R was more of an evolution of a design rather than an all new car which required long periods of testing and design.  Pratt & Miller's process was aided by the fact that, unlike the C5-R which debuted several years after the C5 generation Corvette was on the streets, the C6.R and C6 generation Corvettes would be developed at the same time.  This meant that design elements which would help the race car could be adapted to the road car, allowing the C6.R to use more exotic design features but still meet homologation requirements.  In turn, this meant racing elements could be adapted to the Corvette Z06 performance car, which the C6.R shares it exterior styling with.

Much of the framework of the road legal C6 was retained on the C6.R, leading to increased use of weight-saving aluminium.  The road car would also replace the C5's pop-up headlamps with permanent designs integrated into the bodywork.  This meant that the racing car would have better air flow over the front of the car, doing away with their replacements for the pop-up headlamps which stuck out of the bodywork.  The large grill opening on the car would also serve to eliminate the variety of openings on the C5-R to feed not only the brake cooling ducts, but also help with downforce by exiting back out the top of the bonnet.

Underneath, the C6.R retained much of the mechanical elements from the C5-R.  The same Katech-built 7.0 litre V8 was used, but more closely based on the LS7 from the Z06.  This engine, known as the LS7.R, would go on to earn the Global Motorsports Engine of the Year award in 2006 for its performance and endurance capabilities.  Like the C5-R, the C6.R lacked a rear window due to structural framework and fuel tanks taking up the space behind the cockpit.  However, an innovation on the C6.R was the addition of a small video camera into the rear bumper, and a monitor placed on the roof of the cockpit.  This allowed the drivers a better view behind them, instead of having to rely on their side mirrors.

Another innovation was the use of an air conditioning system in the car in order to help drivers better endure high cockpit temperatures.  This required the addition of a large suction fan to the rear of the car, as well as intakes integrated into the side mirrors.  One innovation which the C6.R debuted in 2007 was the use of variable displacement.  This system would disable half of the cylinders in the engine during caution periods in order to increase fuel economy when speed was not important.  Although the system was tested during the season, its failure at the 2007 24 Hours of Le Mans led the team to remove it from the cars until it could be further evaluated.

As of the end of the 2007 season, six C6.Rs had been built by Pratt & Miller.  A seventh car, used for development work, was actually built on a C5-R chassis but adapted to carry C6.R bodywork.  This car has never raced and is used merely as a show car, making its public debut alongside the C6 Corvette at the 2005 North American International Auto Show.

Racing history

Corvette Racing

Following the retirement of the C5-R at the end of 2004, the factory Corvette Racing squad started 2005 with two brand new C6.Rs.  Unlike the previous car, which ran only select events until it could be proven quick and reliable, the C6.Rs would compete in the full American Le Mans Series season in their first year.  The season did not begin as Corvette Racing had planned however, as the equally new Prodrive Aston Martin DBR9 managed to win the initial event at Sebring, earning Corvette Racing their first loss since the end of 2003.  Prodrive returned to Europe after Sebring, and Corvette Racing was able to earn wins in each of the succeeding races that season.  Even when Prodrive returned for the final two rounds, the improved Corvettes continued their streak and won both races.  The C6.Rs also ventured to Europe for the 24 Hours of Le Mans, where the team was able to outlast the quicker DBR9s to earn a 1–2 victory in the GT1 class and finish fifth and sixth overall.

In 2006, Prodrive chose to concentrate on the American Le Mans Series, giving Corvette Racing a battle throughout the season.  Corvette Racing avenged their loss at Sebring, but Aston Martin managed their own victories later in the season.  The two teams were close in the points championship throughout the season, before Corvette Racing managed to earn a three-point margin in the last race and won their second straight championship.  At Le Mans, the Aston Martins once again faltered with reliability problems after leading the event, allowing a Corvette C6.R to finish the race fourth overall and win the GT1 class.  The Aston Martin - Corvette duel at Le Mans saw both rivals finishing with a record-breaking pace for homologated GT cars, with the distance record set by Corvette Racing unbroken as of 2022.

Following the 2006 season, Prodrive returned to Europe to concentrate on improving the DBR9 for Le Mans.  This meant that Corvette Racing was left without a major opponent in the American Le Mans Series, and in fact were the only competitors in the GT1 class for nine out of twelve races that year, and easily allowing Corvette Racing to earn their third championship.  At Le Mans, the Corvettes were not able to repeat their previous success as Aston Martin was finally able to reliably maintain their pace over 24 hours and earn their first class victory, leaving Corvette Racing with second.

In order to honor Canadian driver Ron Fellows, Corvette Racing entered a third C6.R at the Grand Prix of Mosport.  This third car was painted in white and red colors to match the Ron Fellows Edition Corvette Z06, a limited edition road car in honor of Fellows's involvement with the Corvette Racing program since its inception.  Ron Fellows drove the car for his home race.

Corvette Racing ran the GT1 C6.Rs in the early events of the 2009 American Le Mans Series season and retired their cars at the 2009 24 Hours of Le Mans to focus on their new GT2 program.

Two cars were entered in the LMGTE Pro category at the 2012 24 Hours of Le Mans, weighing 1245 kg. One car was not classified, with the other achieving 23rd place overal.

Corvette Racing previously campaigned the C6.R GT2 in the American Le Mans Series GT class. The team also competed with the cars at the 24 Hours of Le Mans and won the 2011 GTE-Pro class.

Privateer teams
Like the C5-R, C6.Rs which had been used by the factory team eventually ended up in the hands of privateers once they were replaced by newer chassis.  Unlike before, these Corvettes were sold less than a year after they had debuted, rather than the four years it took for a C5-R to be sold to another team. Corvette Motorsport, based in Belgium, currently handles the unity of teams and media promotion for the privateers currently competing in Europe.

GLPK-Carsport

GLPK-Carsport was formed by Belgian entrepreneur Paul Kumpen and Toine Hezemans following a merger of PK Carsport and Carsport Holland.  After running the C5-R successfully in 2005, Toine Hezemans decided to buy one of the two C6.Rs used by Corvette Racing during the 2005 season.  GLPK-Carsport added this chassis to their stable to replace their C5-R in the FIA GT Championship.  The driving team of Bert Longin, Anthony Kumpen, and Mike Hezemans drove the car throughout the season, and were able to score a victory at Paul Ricard as well as a third-place finish at the Spa 24 Hours.

Carsport Holland
In 2007, GLPK-Carsport's partnership ended and Carsport Holland merged with new partner Jean-Denis Délétraz's Phoenix Racing to form Carsport Holland.  Carsport Holland won the Spa 24 Hours.  Joined by Marcel Fässler and Fabrizio Gollin, the team was able to fend off the Vitaphone Racing Maserati and earn Corvette's first victory at the endurance event.  Carsport Holland earned one final victory at Nogaro before closing the season fourth in the teams' championship and third in the drivers' championship.

In 2008 the team partnered with GMAC and entered two C6.Rs and scored several pole positions and 2 race wins. After gaining one win and five pole positions, Marcel Fässler was hired by the factory Corvette Racing squad in late 2008.

PK Carsport

Following GLPK-Carsport's split in 2007, PK Racing returned to campaigning their C5-R before switching to a Saleen in 2008.  PK Racing however returned to the C6.R chassis in 2009, merging with Phoenix Racing following Toine Hezemans's withdrawal of Carsport Holland from their previous partnership. The team currently has 2 wins this season including the 24 Hours of Spa, Corvette's 2nd win in the race in the last 3 years.

DKR Engineering
Belgian PSI Experience chose to concentrate their efforts on the French FFSA GT Championship as well as joining the Le Mans Series during their debut in 2006.  The team earned one victory at Lédenon for FFSA, while a third at the 1000 km of Spa was their best result in the LMS.  PSI also chose to enter a few FIA GT rounds, most notably the Spa 24 Hours.  The team finished fifth in the event, before joining FIA GT once again at Paul Ricard and finishing second behind GLPK-Carsport's C6.R.

For 2007, PSI's C6.R was entered mostly in FFSA GT events, while select appearances in FIA GT as well as the 24 Hours of Le Mans were made. Starting in 2008, the owner of PSI loaned both of his cars to friends Dany Lallemand and Kendy Janclaes of DKR Engineering to form their own team using PSI's mechanics. The team mostly competes in the FFSA French GT with occasional appearances in the FIA GT.

In June 2009, the team was transformed to Sangari Team Brazil, the first Brazilian team in FIA GT, to further Brazilian interest and participation. DKR Engineering stills runs the car and provides technical assistance. The drivers will be Enrique Bernoldi and Roberto Streit. The team made their debut appearance at the Spa 24 Hours.

They ran one car in the 2011 FIA GT1 World Championship season with drivers Michaël Rossi, Jaime Camara, Dimitri Enjalbert and, for one round, Matteo Bobbi. They ran a black livery for most of the season but in round seven they ran with the same livery used by Exim Bank Team China.

Luc Alphand Aventures

Another team who had already purchased a C5-R, Luc Alphand's squad purchased a C6.R to run alongside their C5-R in the Le Mans Series as the team earned factory support from Pratt & Miller for their European campaign. As part of Pratt & Miller's support of Luc Alphand, Corvette Racing drivers Oliver Gavin and Olivier Beretta. 2007 saw the team briefly enter in the FIA GT at the Spa 24 Hours Oliver Gavin and Olivier Beretta. The team managed to finish in sixth place.

For the 2008 season, the team managed to beat Team Modena's Aston Martin to the Le Mans Series Team and Drivers Championship. Luc Alphand opted to split the teams 2 cars to race 1 in the FIA GT Championship and 1 the Le Mans Series.

Selleslagh Racing Team

Patrick Selleslagh became the very first customer Corvette team after purchasing a C5-R chassis in late 2001. SRT has gone on to win several Belcar Championships including 2005, with five victories, and also in 2006 where they scored another win in the Zolder 24 hours after victory in 2005.

The team's 2008 season consisted of entries in the FFSA French GT and the FIA GT Championship. Winning in Monza with Christophe Bouchut and Xavier Maassen, they scored their first ever win in the Championship. For the 2009 season, SRT campaigned their C6.R in both the FIA GT and FFSA French GT championships. Former PK driver Bert Longin was racing with the Belgian squad for the FIA GT alongside James Ruffier.

In the 2010 season, SRT competed in the FIA GT1 World Championship series under the flag of the Mad-Croc Racing.

In 2011 the SRT Corvette was entered under the Exim Bank Team China title, with drivers Mike Hezemans and Nick Catsburg. They had a pole and podium result (3rd place) in the silverstone race.

In 2014 SRT Corvette will be participating in the International GT Open with Maxime Soulet and Nicky Catsburg. In the BRCC they will be participating with Maxime Soulet, Maarten Makelberge and a third driver.

Race Victories

Pratt & Miller C6RS
It is a conversion of Corvette Z06 that resembles C6.R and shares components with the race car, produced by Pratt & Miller. It uses Katech Performance 8.2L engine rated 600 horsepower and 600 lb-ft torque. The car has top speed of 202 mph. The production began in April 2008. 25 were produced in the first year.  Only 7 Corvette C6RS were ever built but the original intention was to build 25 cars.

A version running E85 ethanol was created with Jay Leno, appeared in 2007 SEMA show.  Convertible version was unveiled in 2008 12 Hours of Sebring.

Corvette C6.R GT2

On September 9, 2008, Corvette Racing GM Road Racing Group manager Steve Wesoloski and Corvette Racing program manager Doug Fehan announced that for the 2009 ALMS season they would be running the C6.R in the GT1 class for only the first half of the season.  After the 24 hours of Le Mans, Corvette Racing ran a newly designed C6.R in the GT2 class in preparation for the 2010 season's GT class regulations.

The car uses a newly designed 6.0L V8 making 470 bhp, which is based on the 7.0L LS7.R from the GT1 car (which produced 590 bhp).  As part of the GT regulations for 2010, the engine would be downsized to 5.5L to comply with the new engine displacement limits. The new GT2 car takes body styling cues from the then new Corvette ZR1 street car.  The car sports a new aluminum frame (the GT1 car had a steel frame), smaller front splitter and rear wing, and steel brakes (the GT1 used carbon ceramic brakes), bringing it closer to the build of the Z06 road car. Due to its 5.5L motor displacement, the car was penalized with extra weight and waivers, much to the advantage of the competing Ferrari F430 GTC, whose powerplant generated the same 500 bhp but from a 4.0L V8.

The new GT2 car began its campaign in the GT2 class starting with the 2009 Mid-Ohio race.  Despite competing in a new class with a new car the #3 car of Jan Magnussen and Johnny O'Connell took 2nd in their first race and won their third race at Mosport after a long battle with the Risi Competizione Ferrari F430 GT.

At 2010 24 Hours of Le Mans, factory GT2 Corvettes retired after engine problems and a collision with Anthony Davidson's Peugeot. Only one of four entered Corvettes - GT1 C6R of Luc Alphand Aventures - eventually finished the race, taking second place in class. This was the final year of GT1 in ACO racing. The Corvette was clocked at 182 mph down the Mulsanne Straight, which was the fastest GT car (GT1 and GT2).

For the 2011 season, the Corvette saw several performance upgrades, most notably the addition of a paddle-shift transmission. This particular car has won the 2011 24 Hours of Le Mans in the GTE-Pro category.

In 2012, the C6.R took advantage of new regulations to grow 50mm wider at the wheelwells. This reportedly makes the car more stable and increases mechanical grip. Corvette Racing scored a 2nd-place finish at the 2012 12 Hours of Sebring and won the 2012 American Le Mans Series at Long Beach, the first win for Corvette since Mosport in 2011. At the 2012 24 Hours of Le Mans, the #74 took an early lead of the race from the Aston Martin V8 Vantage GTE; however, a wheel fell off due to a missing wheel nut during the night which resulted in significant damage to the gearbox and other components. The #74 eventually finished unclassified due to not meeting the minimum percentage of the class winner. The #73 suffered tire issues and later had a broken steering rack which delayed the team for about an hour; the car finished 5th in class. Corvette Racing won the 2012 GT Team's and Driver's championship with 4 class wins.

In 2013, Corvette Racing repeated its success and won the 2013 ALMS GT championships with 5 GT victories, including the 12 Hours of Sebring.

Privateer teams
V8 racing, Selleslagh Racing Team

Larbre Competition

The first team to run a privateer Corvette C6.R GT2 car was the French-based Larbre Competition. In their first race with the car, they finished with a DNF at the 2011 12 Hours of Sebring, but would later come back to win the GTE-Am class of the 2011 24 Hours of Le Mans. They would also go on to win the GTE-Am class championship of the 2011 Intercontinental Le Mans Cup. For 2012, they are running in the FIA World Endurance Championship in the GTE-Am class again with two C6.R Corvettes. They repeated their Le Mans success by winning the 2012 24 Hours of Le Mans in the GTE-Am class for a second year in a row after car No. 50 driven by ex-Peugeot Sport driver Pedro Lamy took the lead with less than an hour to go from the No. 67 IMSA Performance Matmut Porsche 997 GT3-RSR driven at the time by Anthony Pons. The Larbre Corvette, at 1260 kg, finished 20th overall ahead of the sole remaining factory Corvette. Car No. 70 finished fifth in class.

References

External links

Corvette Racing 
Corvette Motorsport
C6.R Chassis History
DKR Engineering
Luc Alphand Aventures (French)
Pratt & Miller C6RS
 https://www.cevrolet.nl

C6.R
Grand tourer racing cars
24 Hours of Le Mans race cars
LM GTE cars